Princess Royal is an abandoned town in the Goldfields–Esperance region in Western Australia.  It was named after a gold mine that was the basis for the town. The mine was named after Victoria, Princess Royal, eldest daughter of Queen Victoria. It was located near Norseman.

A rich gold reef was discovered in the area in the 1895 by a party of prospectors – Chester, Peddler and Flanagan. Alluvial gold was later found in 1900 and a townsite was established to house the miners. The townsite was gazetted in 1904.
At one stage there were two adjacent mines- Princess Royal, and Princess Royal Central.

A police station was built before 1905 and the first officer in charge arrived in that year; the station later closed in 1908. The town boasted four hotels in 1906, as well as a host of other businesses.

References

Ghost towns in Western Australia
Shire of Dundas